Dane K. Jackson (born May 17, 1970) is a Canadian coach and former professional ice hockey right wing who spent parts of four seasons in the National Hockey League between 1993 and 1998. Selected by the Vancouver Canucks in the 1988 NHL Entry Draft, he spent four years at the University of North Dakota before making his professional debut for the Canucks' American Hockey League (AHL) affiliate in 1992. Jackson made his NHL debut in 1993, and would split the next two seasons between the Canucks and their AHL affiliates, the Hamilton Canucks and Syracuse Crunch. He joined the Buffalo Sabres in 1995, though spent most of the next two years with their AHL affiliate, the Rochester Americans, and in 1997 signed with the New York Islanders. Jackson spent the final six seasons of his playing career in the AHL, moving between the Americans, Lowell Lock Monsters, and Manchester Monarchs, before retiring in 2003. Company Since then he has worked as a coach, and has been on the coaching staff of North Dakota since 2006.

Playing career
A gritty, hard-working winger, Jackson was drafted in the third round, 44th overall, by the Vancouver Canucks in the 1988 NHL Entry Draft. He attended the University of North Dakota the following season, and although his college career got off to a slow start, he showed steady improvement and recorded 23 goals by his senior year. Joining him at North Dakota was fellow 1988 Canuck pick Dixon Ward, the first of four different stops where the two players would play together.

Jackson turned pro in 1992, and spent most of the next three seasons with the Canucks' AHL affiliates. He performed well in limited NHL action, scoring six goals in 13 games, but struggled to crack a deep Vancouver squad. He became a free agent in 1995 and signed with the Buffalo Sabres.

In 1995–96, Jackson had his longest NHL audition, registering 5 goals and 9 points in 22 games for the Sabres. He also (along with his old college linemate Dixon Ward) helped the Rochester Americans, Buffalo's AHL affiliate, to the Calder Cup Championship. He signed with the New York Islanders in 1997, and play eight more NHL games in the 1997–98 season, recording a goal and an assist.

Jackson continued on in the AHL until retiring in 2003. He finished his NHL career with 12 goals and 6 assists for 18 points in 45 career games. He added another 199 goals in 11 seasons in the AHL.

Coaching career
Following his playing career, Jackson served as an assistant coach with the Manchester Monarchs, the same team he played his final two seasons with, from 2003–2005.  In January 2006, he was named head coach of the Adirondack Frostbite of the United Hockey League following the death of coach Marc Potvin.

Jackson is currently an assistant coach at his alma mater, the University of North Dakota, who advanced to the NCAA Frozen Four during his first season in 2006–07.

Career statistics

Regular season and playoffs

References

External links
 

1970 births
Living people
Buffalo Sabres players
Canadian ice hockey right wingers
Hamilton Canucks players
Ice hockey people from British Columbia
Lowell Lock Monsters players
Manchester Monarchs (AHL) players
New York Islanders players
Sportspeople from Castlegar, British Columbia
Rochester Americans players
Syracuse Crunch players
North Dakota Fighting Hawks men's ice hockey players
Vancouver Canucks draft picks
Vancouver Canucks players
Vernon Lakers players